Manley is an unincorporated community in Fulton County, Illinois, United States. Manley is located along Illinois Route 9 northeast of Bushnell.

References

Unincorporated communities in Fulton County, Illinois
Unincorporated communities in Illinois